The 2012 season was Molde's 5th consecutive year in Tippeligaen, and their 36th season in the top flight of Norwegian football. It was Ole Gunnar Solskjær's second season as the club's manager. Molde were defending champions in Tippeligaen and played through qualification for UEFA Champions League. Molde entered the Champions League in the second qualifying round, where they eliminated Ventspils before and facing Basel of Switzerland in the third qualifying round. They lost 1–2 on aggregate and were knocked out, dropping down into the Play off round of the UEFA Europa League. Molde successfully defended their title on 11 November 2012, when they beat Hønefoss 1–0, whilst their closest title challengers, Strømsgodset lost 2–1 away to Sandnes Ulf.

Transfers

In

 Linnes' move was announced on 31 August 2011 and finalised on 1 January 2012.

Out

Loan in

Loan out

Coaching staff

Pre-season and friendlies

Friendlies

Copa del Sol

Competitions

Tippeligaen

Results summary

Results by round

Results

Table

Norwegian Cup

UEFA Champions League

Qualifying phase

UEFA Europa League

Play-off round

Group stage

Notes
Note 1: Steaua București played their home matches at Arena Națională, Bucharest instead of their regular stadium, Stadionul Steaua, Bucharest.

Squad statistics

Appearances and goals

|-
|colspan="14"|Players away from Molde on loan:

|-
|colspan="14"|Players who appeared for Molde no longer at the club:

|}

Goal scorers

Disciplinary record

See also
Molde FK seasons

References

2012
Molde
Molde
Molde
Norwegian football championship-winning seasons